General of the Artillery is/was a general officer of artillery, and may be:
General of the Artillery (Germany) and Austria-Hungary
General of the Artillery (Imperial Russia)
General of the Artillery (Poland)
Feldzeugmeister (OF-8) of the Austria-Hungarian armed forces 1868-1918

See also
Master-General of the Ordnance
General of the Infantry
General of the Cavalry

Artillery
Military ranks